The 2002 Texas A&M Aggies football team completed the season with a 6–6 record.  The Aggies had a regular season Big 12 record of 3–5. Head coach R. C. Slocum was fired at the end of the season and replaced by Dennis Franchione. Despite finishing the season bowl eligible, the Aggies did not participate in a bowl game.

Schedule

Game summaries

Louisiana-Lafayette

Pittsburgh

Virginia Tech

Louisiana Tech

Texas Tech

Baylor

Kansas

Nebraska

Oklahoma State

Oklahoma

Missouri

Texas

Roster

References

Texas AandM
Texas A&M Aggies football seasons
Texas AandM Aggies football